Catherine is an unincorporated community and census-designated place in Wilcox County, Alabama, United States. As of the 2020 census, its population was 65.

Geography

Jake Peavy, the professional baseball player, lives in Catherine.

Demographics

2020 census

Note: the US Census treats Hispanic/Latino as an ethnic category. This table excludes Latinos from the racial categories and assigns them to a separate category. Hispanics/Latinos can be of any race.

References

Unincorporated communities in Alabama
Census-designated places in Wilcox County, Alabama